D. Ganesan is an Indian politician and presently serving Member of the Legislative Assembly of Tamil Nadu. He was elected to the Tamil Nadu legislative assembly as an Anna Dravida Munnetra Kazhagam candidate from Theni constituency in 2001 and 2006 elections.

References 

All India Anna Dravida Munnetra Kazhagam politicians
Living people
Year of birth missing (living people)

Tamil Nadu MLAs 2001–2006
Tamil Nadu MLAs 2006–2011